A muscle is a contractile tissue in an animal's body used especially for movement. 

Muscle or  Muscles may also refer to:

Arts and entertainment
Muscle (TV series), comedy set inside a fictional gym in New York City
"Muscles", an episode of the animated TV series Aqua TV Show Show
Muscles (musician), Australian electronica musician Chris Copulos
Les Musclés, a 1990s French band
Muscles (album) (2007), by hip-hop musician Mele Mel
"Muscles" (song), by Diana Ross
M.U.S.C.L.E., small pink action figures produced in the United States in the 1980s
M.U.S.C.L.E. (video game), NES wrestling game based on the manga and anime Kinnikuman
Mr. Muscles, a superhero in two 1956 comic book issues
Mister Muscle, a member of the DC Comics Hero Hotline team
Masked Muscle, an opponent in the Super NES video game Super Punch-Out!!

People
"Muscles", nickname of Venkatapathy Raju (born 1969), Indian former cricketer
"Muscles", nickname of Ken Rosewall (born 1934), Australian retired tennis player
Leo "Muscle" Shoals (1916-1999), American minor league baseball player
Max Muscle (1963-2019), former American professional wrestler

Other uses
ST Muscle a tugboat in service with the French Government from 1946 to 1951
MUSCLE (alignment software), a multiple sequence alignment tool
MUSCLE, non-Windows API to Common Access Cards

See also
Jean-Claude Van Damme (born 1960), Belgian actor and martial artist nicknamed "the Muscles from Brussels"
Mussel, marine or freshwater species, members of several different families of clams or bivalve molluscs
Musele (disambiguation)

Lists of people by nickname